Trophime-Gérard, marquis de Lally-Tollendal (5 March 175111 March 1830) was a French politician and philanthropist.

Born in Paris into an old aristocratic family, he was the legitimized son of Thomas Arthur de Lally, who served as viceroy in India under King Louis XIV, and only discovered the secret of his birth on the day of his father's execution (9 May 1766), when he devoted himself to clearing his father's memory. He was supported by Voltaire, and in 1778 succeeded in persuading King Louis XVI to annul the decree which had sentenced the Comte de Lally, but the parlement of Rouen, to which the case was referred back, in 1784 again decided in favour of Lally's guilt. The case was retried by other courts, and Lally's innocence was never fully admitted by the French judges.

In 1779 Lally-Tollendal bought the honorary title of Grand bailli of Étampes, and in 1789 was a deputy to the Estates-General for the noblesse of Paris. He played some part in the early stages of the French Revolution, but, as a conservative, quickly rejected more profound changes.

Early life 
Trophime Gerard Lally-Tollendal was born into an old aristocratic family on 5 March 1751. Although he was the legitimate son of Thomas Arthur Lally, he was kept unaware of his Irish heritage through his bringing up under the name Trophime. He learned of his ancestry the day of his own father's execution on May 9, 1766. After his father's execution, Lally-Tollendal spent most of his adult life fighting to clear his father's name. During this time he attended the College of Harcourt which allowed him to gain the skills needed to not only fight against his father's verdict but participate in French government.

Fighting for His Father's Innocence 
Trophime's introduction into the French political world was through his constant fight to prove his father's innocence. Lally-Tollendal first began this investigation when he was only 19 years old. He sought the help of Voltaire for his influence and strengths in writing. He first approached Voltaire in 1770 via a letter outlining every injustice and false accusation made against his father. Unfortunately, at the time, Trophime Gérard de Lally-Tollendal was considered Thomas Arthur's illegitimate son. This disqualified him from defending his father in a court of law. In 1772, Trophime achieved his legitimacy and the process of clearing his father's name officially began.

It is important to note that the outcome of the Thomas Arthur case is unclear. Some sources record that Thomas Arthur's case was reopened and retried more than 3 times. Although the King and his Council ruled in favor of Thomas Arthur's innocence, courts across the different provinces of France declared him guilty time and time again.

Other sources state that King Louis XVI single-handedly repealed the guilty verdict while similar sources state that along with King Louis XVI, the King's Council gathered over the case and had a majority vote in support of Thomas Arthur's innocence.

What is certain is that Thomas Arthur's innocence was never officially recorded.

Politics 
At the beginning of the Revolution, Lally-Tollendal was in support of a Revolution and supported the Marquis de Lafayette. But, as the Revolution progressed, Lally-Tollendal's own conservative ideologies prevented him from continuing his support. As a result, he became in full support of Le Ancien Régime and France's traditional institutions.

Trophime Gérard de Lally-Tollendal was in favor of King Louis XVI even under the circumstances of the French Revolution. Throughout the Revolution, Lally-Tollendal remained entirely loyal to the King and even risked his life in an attempt to defend the King during his trial.

Lally-Tollendal was also part of Clermont-Tonnerre's Monarchist Club. One of the first issues this club experienced was the Constituent Assembly's refusal to declare Catholicism as France's national religion. As well as being part of Clermont-Tonnerre's Monarchist Club, Lally-Tollendal, Clermont-Tonnerre, Bertrand de Molleville, and Malouet all plotted to help save the King from hiding on 10 August 1792. Unfortunately all of the men were recognized on the street and hunted down. They all fled to the Hôtel of Madame de Brassac where Clermont-Tonnerre was ultimately killed.

Although Lally-Tollendal supported the King, he also was in support of a government with three bodies. This new government would consist of a Senate, Chamber of Representatives, and the reigning King. Each legislative body would have the power to veto but ultimately the King's vetoes held more weight. These legislative bodies would be put in place in order to create a governmental balance to ensure equal distribution of power.

Exile and return

In 1792 Lally-Tollendal was arrested but managed to emigrate to England prior to the September Massacres. He joined the opposition to the strict regime of the Marquis de Mirabeau, and condemned the decisive rejection of the Ancien Régime by the National Constituent Assembly, begun by the Tennis Court Oath and confirmed by the abolition of feudalism on 4 August 1789. Later in the year he emigrated to Great Britain.

During the trial of Louis XVI by the National Convention (December 1792 - January 1793) he offered to defend the king, but was not allowed to return to France. He did not return until after the establishment of the Consulate. Louis XVIII honoured him  with the title of Peer of France, and in 1816 he became a member of the Académie française.

From that time until his death, he devoted himself to philanthropic work, especially identifying himself with prison reform. He died in Paris on March 11, 1830.

Family

He married a Scottish girl: Miss Halket of Pitfirran, a noted singer in Edinburgh.

Works
Lally-Tollendal, Plaidoyer pour Louis XVI, London, 1793
Défense des émigrés français adressée au peuple français par Trophime Gérard de Lally-Tollendal. Avant-propos de l’auteur, (daté de Londres, janvier 1797). Hambourg, chez P.F. Fauche, Imprimeur – Libraire, 1797, (X + 247 pages).
Mémoires, attributed to Joseph Weber, concerning Marie Antoinette (1804, partial authorship)

References

Additional References 
1. Dana, Charles A. (Charles Anderson), ed, Ripley, George, ed. The new american cyclopaedia: A popular dictionary of general knowledge. Appleton; 1867. http://hdl.handle.net/2027/mdp.39015036731753.

2. Lally-Tolendal, Trophime-Gérard, marquis de, 1751-1830. Mémoire de M. le comte de Lally-Tollendal, ou seconde lettre a ses commettans. France: ; 1790. http://catalog.hathitrust.org/Record/000602038.

3. Lally-Tolendal T, marquis de, Gifford J. A defence of the french emigrants : Addressed to the people of france. ; 1797. http://hdl.handle.net/2027/yale.39002005692471.

4. Judicial affairs. http://voltpe.free.fr/page1.html.

5. Sean Ryan. The lally wild geese. http://indigo.ie/~wildgees/lally.htm. Updated 2002.

6. Alan Garric. Trophime Gérard de Lally-Tollendal. Geneanet Web site. http://gw.geneanet.org/garric?lang=en&p=trophime+gerard&n=de+lally+tollendal.

7. Wedderburn, Alexander Dundas Ogilvy, 1854. The wedderburn book, a history of the wedderburns in the counties of berwick, and forfar. ; 1898. http://catalog.hathitrust.org/Record/001597968.

8. Henry Morse Stephens, ed. A history of the french revolution, volume 1. Scribner; 1905; No. 1.

9. Trophime Gérard de Lally-Tollendal. http://www.academie-francaise.fr/les-immortels/trophime-gerard-de-lally-tollendal.

Sources

 In turn, it gives the following references:
Antoine-Vincent Arnault, Discours prononcé aux funérailles de M. le marquis de Lally-Tollendal le 13 mars 1830 (Paris)
Charles-Edmé Gauthier de Brecy, Nécrologie de M. le marquis de Lally-Tollendal (Paris, undated)
Voltaire, Œuvres complètes (Paris, 1889) - the analytical table of contents, vol. ii

1751 births
1830 deaths
18th-century French people
19th-century French people
Politicians from Paris
Marquesses of Lally-Tollendal
Counts of Lally-Tollendal
Monarchiens
Members of the National Constituent Assembly (France)
Members of the Chamber of Peers of the Bourbon Restoration
French philanthropists
Members of the Académie Française